Sainte-Pazanne is a commune in the Loire-Atlantique department, western France.

Population

Twin towns
 Harrold, Bedfordshire

Transport

Gare de Sainte-Pazanne is served by train services between Pornic, Saint-Gilles-Croix-de-Vie and Nantes.

See also
Communes of the Loire-Atlantique department

References

Communes of Loire-Atlantique
Pornic Agglo Pays de Retz